The 2019–20 season are the Persepolis's 19th season in the Pro League, and their 37th consecutive season in the top division of Iranian Football. They were also be competing in the Hazfi Cup, Super Cup and AFC Champions League.

Squad

First team squad

New Contracts

Transfers

In

Out

Transfer(cost and benefit)
Undisclosed fees are not included in the transfer totals.

Expenditure

Summer:  €4,100,000

Winter:  €1,050,000

Total:  €5,150,000

Income

Summer:  €2,975,000

Winter:  €100,000

Total:  €3,075,000

Net totals

Summer:  €1,125,000

Winter:  €950,000

Total:  €2,075,000

Technical staff 

|}

Competitions

Overview

Persian Gulf Pro League

Results summary

Results by round

League table

Matches

Hazfi Cup

Matches

Super Cup 

Since Persepolis won both 2018-19 Persian Gulf Pro League and Hazfi Cup, so the Iran Football Association announced them as the 2019 Super Cup winner.

AFC Champions League

Group stage

Matches

Friendly Matches

Pre-season

During season

Statistics

Scorers

Assists

Goalkeeping

Disciplinary record

Awards

Team

Player

Club

Kit 

|- style="vertical-align: top;"
|

|

|

Sponsorship 

Main sponsor: Tourism Bank
Other sponsors: Irancell
Bonmano coffee
Official shirt manufacturer: Uhlsport

Notes

References

External links 
Iran Premier League Statistics
Persian League
Persepolis News

Persepolis F.C. seasons
Persepolis